Ray Buckingham (1 March 1930 – 8 July 2014) was an Australian fencer. He competed in the team foil event at the 1956 Summer Olympics.

References

1930 births
2014 deaths
Australian male fencers
Olympic fencers of Australia
Fencers at the 1956 Summer Olympics